Morpho laertes (formerly Morpho epistrophus), the White morpho or Epistrophus white morpho, is a Neotropical butterfly found in Brazil, Uruguay, Paraguay, and Argentina. The white morpho is native to the Atlantic Forest, where they are distributed throughout a landscape of multiple species.

Description
In 1913, Hans Fruhstorfer wrote in Die Gross-Schmetterlinge der Erde:

Taxonomy
When first described in 1782 laertes was placed in the genus Papilio. The specimen was from Brasília. It is a valid name in The Global Lepidoptera Names Index.

Currently it is placed in the subgenus Pessonia (Le Moult & Réal 1962) of genus Morpho, along with the closely related species Morpho catenarius (Perry, 1811), Morpho luna (Butler), Morpho polyphemus (Dixey), and Morpho titei (Drury, 1770). It is now considered a junior synonym of Morpho epistrophus.

Etymology
The name comes from Laërtes, a figure in Greek mythology. Epistrophus is a character in the Iliad.

Subspecies
Subspecies in alphabetical order:
Morpho epistrophus argentinus H. Fruhstorfer, 1907
Morpho epistrophus catenaria Perry, 1811
Morpho epistrophus epistrophus (J.C. Fabricius, 1796) = Morpho laertes Drury 1782 
Morpho epistrophus titei  E. Le Moult & P. Réal, 1962

References

Bibliography
Blandin, P. 2007. The genus Morpho, Lepidoptera Nymphalidae. Part 3. The Subgenera Pessonia, Grasseia and Morpho and Addenda to Parts 1 & 2. Hillside Books, Canterbury
Le Moult (E.) & Réal (P.) (1962–1963). "Les Morpho d'Amérique du Sud et Centrale." Editions du cabinet entomologique. E. Le Moult, Paris.

External links
Osaka University Images of M. laertes
"Morpho Fabricius, 1807" at Markku Savela's Lepidoptera and Some Other Life Forms with taxonomy and subspecies
Butterflies of America Images of type and other specimens.

laertes
Butterflies described in 1782